Merriam's shrew (Sorex merriami) is a species of mammal in the family Soricidae. It is endemic to the western United States and extreme southern British Columbia in Canada.

References

Mammals of North America
Sorex
Taxonomy articles created by Polbot
Mammals described in 1890